Nikos Peios (born 17 June 1999) is a Greek professional footballer who plays as a centre-back for Super League 2 club Kifisia.

Career statistics

Club

References

1999 births
Living people
Greek footballers
Super League Greece 2 players
Ergotelis F.C. players
Association football defenders
Footballers from Veria